Hatshepsut: Daughter of Amun is a novel written by Moyra Caldecott in 1989. It was first published in Great Britain in 1989 as a paperback by Arrow Books Limited.

Plot introduction
Ancient Egypt 3500 years ago - a land ruled by the all-powerful female king, Hatshepsut. Ambitious, ruthless and worldly: a woman who established Amun as the chief god of Egypt, bestowing his Priesthood with unprecedented riches and power.

Hatshepsut: Daughter of Amun is part of Moyra Caldecott’s Egyptian sequence, which also includes Akhenaten: Son of the Sun and Tutankhamun and the Daughter of Ra. Chronologically, Hatshepsut: Daughter of Amun takes place first.

Release details
1989, UK, Arrow Books Limited , Pub date ? June 1989, paperback
2001, UK, Mushroom Publishing , Pub date 1 April 2000, ebook
2004, UK, Bladud Books , Pub date 1 April 2004, paperback (as a Print on Demand paperback)

1989 British novels
Novels set in ancient Egypt
Novels set in the 15th century BC
Cultural depictions of Hatshepsut
Arrow Books books